The Day Building is a building located in northwest Portland, Oregon listed on the National Register of Historic Places.

See also
 National Register of Historic Places listings in Northwest Portland, Oregon

References

1907 establishments in Oregon
Buildings and structures completed in 1907
Colonial Revival architecture in Oregon
National Register of Historic Places in Portland, Oregon
Northwest Portland, Oregon
Portland Historic Landmarks